Komodo may refer to:

Computers 
 Komodo Edit, a free text editor for dynamic programming languages
 Komodo IDE an integrated development environment (IDE) for dynamic programming languages
 Komodo (chess), a chess engine

People 
 Komodo (comics), one of various characters in the Marvel Comics universe
 A character in the comic book series Nocturnals
 A character in the television series The Secret Saturdays

Places - aspects of Komodo island 
 Komodo (island), in Indonesia
 Komodo National Park, the national park of the island
 Komodo (district), the district of Komodo Island
 Komodo (village), the main village of Komodo Island
 Komodo language, the traditional language of Komodo Island
 Komodo dragon, a large species of lizard that inhabits the island

Other uses 
 Komodo (Save a Soul), a recording by Mauro Picotto
Exercise Komodo, naval exercise hosted by Indonesian Navy since 2014
 Komodo (film), a movie
 The Komodos, nickname of Persamba West Manggarai, an association football club in Indonesia
 Pindad Komodo, an Indonesian 4×4 tactical vehicle
Fin Komodo, Indonesian buggy-type vehicle

See also
 Comodo (disambiguation)
 Kamado, a traditional Japanese wood- or charcoal-fueled cook stove